This is a list of bastion forts.

Angola 

 Fortaleza de São Miguel, Luanda
 Fort Nossa Senhora da Vitória
 Fort São Pedro da Barra
 Fortress of Muxima
 Fortress of Kambambe
 Fort São Filipe 
 Fort São Francisco do Penedo
 Quicombo Fort
 Fort São José

Antigua and Barbuda 

 Fort James

Bahrain 

 Forte de Barém - also known as the Qal'at al-Bahrain

Benin
 São João Baptista

Brazil

Fort Orange (Fortaleza de Santa Cruz), Ilha de Itamaracá, State of Pernambuco

Forte de Tiago das Cinco Pontas, Recife, State of Pernambuco
Forte de São João Batista do Brum, Recife, State of Pernambuco
Fortaleza de São José de Macapá, Macapá, Amapá
Forte do Presépio, Belém, Pará
Forte Príncipe da Beira, in Costa Marques, Rondônia
Fortaleza de Nossa Senhora da Assunção, Fortaleza, Ceará (only two bastions remain)
Forte de Nossa Senhora dos Remédios, Fernando de Noronha, State of Pernambuco
Fortaleza dos Reis Magos, Natal, Rio Grande do Norte
Forte de Santa Catarina, Cabedelo, Paraíba
Forte de Santo Inácio de Tamandaré, Tamandaré, State of Pernambuco
Forte do Barbalho, Salvador, Bahia
Forte de São Lourenço, Itaparica, Bahia
Fortaleza de São João da Barra do Rio de Janeiro, Urca, Rio de Janeiro
Forte de São Luís, Niterói, Rio de Janeiro
Fortaleza de Santa Cruz da Barra, Niterói, Rio de Janeiro

Canada

Fort Anne, in Annapolis Royal, Nova Scotia
Fort Beauséjour, in Aulac, New Brunswick
Citadel of Quebec, in Quebec City, Quebec
Fort George, Citadel Hill, in Halifax, Nova Scotia
Fort George, in Niagara-on-the-Lake, Ontario
Fort Mississauga, in Niagara-on-the-Lake, Ontario
Fort Plaisance, Placentia, Newfoundland
Fort Royal, Placentia, Newfoundland
Fort Saint Louis, Placentia, Newfoundland
Fort William, St. John's, Newfoundland
Prince of Wales Fort, Churchill, Manitoba

Cabo Verde

 D'El-Rei, São Vicente
 Duque de Bragança, Ilhéu de Sal Rei
 Principe Real, São Nicolau
 Real de São Filipe, Santiago
 São José, Maio

China 

Macau
 Dona Maria II
 Mong-Há
 Nossa Senhora do Monte 
 Nossa Senhora da Guia
 Nossa Senhora do Bom Parto
 São Francisco
 São Tiago da Barra
 Taipa Fort
 Forbidden city

Croatia
Bilje [Star Fort]
Čakovec [Star Fort / Zrinski Castle]
Karlovac [Star Fort]
Osijek [Tvrđa]
Osijek [Tvrđavica Fortress]
Pula [Fortress Kastel]
Pula [Fort Casoni Vecchi]
Pula [Fort Monvidal]
Senj [repurposed, now Senj Museum east of Velika Vrata]
Šibenik [St. Nicholas Fortress]
Šibenik Barone Fortress
Šibenik St. John's Fortress
Šibenik St. Michael's Fortress
Slavonski Brod [Star Fort]
Ston Fort Kaštio
Zadar [Bastions near Queen Jelena Madijevka Park]

Cuba 

 Castillo San Salvador de la Punta, Havana
 Castillo de los Tres Reyes Magos del Morro, Havana
 Fortaleza de San Carlos de la Cabaña, Havana
 Castillo de la Real Fuerza, Havana
 Castillo del Príncipe, Havana (turned into a prison)
 Castillo de San Severino, Matanzas

Cyprus

Venetian walls of Nicosia, Nicosia

Czech Republic

Olomouc
Fortress Josefov - almost completely preserved, now part of Jaroměř
Terezín - almost completely preserved
Hradec Králové - dismantled in 1884, only small fractions of the fortifications are preserved
Jablunkovské šance in Mosty u Jablunkova
Hrad Špilberk, Brno
Vyšehrad, Prague

Denmark

Copenhagen old town. Bastions are preserved around the eastern (Christianshavn) half of the city. The outline of some sections of the western half is preserved as a series of city parks
Kastellet, Copenhagen
Kronborg, Helsingør
Fredericia, Jutland (Walls of the old city)
Nyborg Fortress, Nyborg (Three bastions preserved)

Estonia
Kuressaare Castle
Narva Old Town
Tallinn Old Town
Pärnu Vallikäär
Tartu Tähetorn
Paldiski Muula mäed

Finland

Hamina Fortress
Kärnäkoski Fortress
Hämeenlinna
Suomenlinna

France

Bayonne, Aquitaine
Belfort, Franche-Comté
Blaye, Aquitaine
Citadel of Arras, Pas-de-Calais
Citadel of Montreuil-sur-Mer, Pas-de-Calais
Citadel of Lille, Nord
Fort Barraux, Isère
Fort de La Prée, Ile de Ré
Fort de Bellegarde, Le Perthus
Fort of Mont Alban, Nice
Fort Carré, Antibes, French riviera
Fort Legarde, Prats-de-Mollo-la-Preste, Pyrénées-Orientales
Neuf-Brisach, Haut Rhin
Le Château-d'Oléron, Charente-Maritime
Perpignan, Languedoc-Roussillon
Place forte of Mont-Dauphin, Haute-Alpes
Citadel of St Jean Pied de Port, Aquitaine
Saint-Martin-de-Ré, Poitou-Charentes
Bergues, Nord
Le Quesnoy, Nord
Maubeuge, Nord
Rocroi, Ardennes
Toul, Lorraine
Gravelines, Nord
Fort de , Le Havre, Seine-Maritime
Fort de Tourneville, Le Havre, Seine-Maritime
Saint-Malo, Ille-et-Vilaine, Brittany
Fort d'Alet, Saint-Servan, Ille-et-Vilaine, Brittany
Navarrenx, Pyrénées-Atlantiques
Citadelle de Besançon
Fort de Bregille, Besançon
Fort de Chaudanne, Besançon
Fort Griffon, Besançon
Fort de La Hougue, Saint-Vaast-la-Hougue, Manche
Fort de Tatihou, Ile de Tatihou
Citadelle d'Entrevaux, Entrevaux, Alpes-de-Haute-Provence
Longwy, Meurthe-et-Moselle

Ghana
 Fort Coenraadsburg 
 Fort Saint Anthony
 Osu Castle 
 Elmina Castle
 São  Sebastião

Germany
Frankfurt am Main
Hamburg
Lübeck
Mainz Citadel
Petersberg Citadel, Erfurt
Rostock
Vechta

Guinea-Bissau
 Cacheu Fort 
 São José

Hungary 
Komarom fortification system includes three forts Csillag, Monostor and Igmandi

India

 Bihu Loukon, Imphal
 Fort São Sebastião, Mumbai
 Fort St. George, Chennai
 Fort William, Kolkata
 Manjarabad Fort, Sakleshpur
 Chaul Fort, Revdanda, Maharashtra
 Star Fort, Jhansi
 St. Angelo Fort
 Fortress of Chaul
 São Tomé, Diu
 Daman
 São Jerónimo

Goa
 Corjuem Fort 
 Santo António 
 Mormugão fort
 Gaspar Dias 
 Reis Magos 
 Aguada Fort 
 São João 
 Santíssima Trindade
 Santa Cruz 
 Cabo de Rama Fort 
 Ponda Fort 
 Gandaulim Fort 
 Naroa Fort 
 Corjuem Fort 
 São Tiago 
 Nossa Senhora do Cabo
 São Sebastião 
 São Bartolomeu
 Santo Estevão

Indonesia 

 Batavia Castle

Israel 

 Temple Mount, Jerusalem

Italy

Capua, Capua, Lazio
Castello Angioino, Mola di Bari
Castello di Acaya, Acaya, Lecce, Apulia
Castello di Carlo V, Crotone, Calabria
Castello di Copertino, Copertino, Apulia
Castello di Lecce, Lecce, Apulia
Castello Normanno-Svevo di Bari, Bari, Apulia
Castello Svevo di Barletta, Barletta, Apulia
Citadel of Alessandria, Alessandria, Piedmont
Citadel of Ancona, Ancona
Città di Castello, Umbria (bastion traces can still be seen in some parts of the city)
Forte a Mare, Brindisi, Apulia
Forte Diamante, Genoa, Liguria
Forte Puin, Genoa, Liguria
Forte San Giacomo, Vado Ligure, Liguria
Forte Santa Tecla, Genoa, Liguria
Fortezza Medicea, Arezzo, Tuscany
Fortezza Nuova, Livorno
Fortezza Vecchia, Livorno
Grosseto, Grosseto, Tuscany
Guastalla, Emilia-Romagna (only survives in outline, walls demolished)
Forte Stella, Porto Ercole, Tuscany
Fortino di Sant'Ignazio, Cagliari, Sardinia
Fortress of Poggio Imperiale, Poggibonsi, Tuscany
Fortress of Priamar, Savona, Liguria
 Fortress of Radicofani, Tuscany
Fortress of Vinadio, Vinadio, Piedmont
Livorno (Old City - traces can still seen)
Lucca, Tuscany
Palmanova, Palmanova, Friuli Venezia Giulia
Sabbioneta, Sabbioneta, Lombardy

Republic of Ireland
Duncannon Fort, Duncannon, County Wexford
Charles Fort, Kinsale
Elizabeth Fort, Cork
Spike Island, County Cork
The Magazine Fort, Phoenix Park, County Dublin

Japan

Goryōkaku in Hokkaido
Tatsuokajō (龍岡城) in Saku, Nagano, Honshu

Latvia
Daugavgrīva Fortress
Daugavpils Fortress
Rīga Old Town, the outline of the bastions preserved as a park

Lithuania
Biržai Castle in Biržai
Klaipėda Castle in Klaipėda
Trakai Island Castle in Trakai
Siege of Kaunas in Kaunas
Lithuanian Sea Museum in Klaipėda

Malaysia
Fort Cornwallis in George Town, Penang

Malta

Cittadella, Victoria, Gozo
Fort Chambray, Għajnsielem
Fort Ricasoli
Fort Manoel
Fort St. Angelo
Fort Saint Elmo mostly a bastion fort, but with one major wall of reentrant angles.
Fort San Lucian
Fort Saint Michael
Fort San Salvatore
Fortifications of Mdina

Mexico
Fort of San Diego
San Juan de Ulúa

Morocco
Borj Nord
El Jadida

Mozambique

 Nossa Senhora da Conceição (Inhambane)
 Nossa Senhora da Conceição (Maputo)
 Santo António
 São Caetano 
 São João Baptista
 São José
 São Lourenço
 São Marçal
 São Sebastião 
 São Tiago Maior

Netherlands

Groningen 

 Appingedam
 Bourtange
 Delfzijl
 Groningen
 Nieuweschans
 Oudeschans
 Winschoten

Friesland 
 Bolsward
 Dokkum
 Franeker
 Harlingen
 Leeuwarden
 Sloten
 Sneek
 Stavoren

Drenthe 
 Coevorden

Overijssel 
 Blokzijl
 Deventer
 Enschede
 Goor
 Hasselt
 Kampen
 Oldenzaal
 Ommen
 Ootmarsum
 Steenwijk
 Vollenhove
 Zwolle

Gelderland 

 Arnhem
 Bredevoort
 Doesburg
 Doetinchem
 Elburg
 Groenlo
 Harderwijk
 Hattem
 Lochem
 Nijmegen
 Tiel
 Wageningen
 Zaltbommel
 Zutphen

Utrecht 

 Amersfoort
 Oudewater
 Utrecht
 Woerden

North Holland 

 Alkmaar
 Amsterdam
 Edam
 Enkhuizen
 Haarlem
 Hoorn
 Medemblik
 Monnickendam
 Muiden
 Naarden
 Purmerend
 Weesp

South Holland 

 Brielle
 Gorinchem
 Hellevoetsluis
 Nieuwpoort

Zeeland 

 Aardenburg
 Brouwershaven
 Fort Bath
 Goes
 Hulst
 IJzendijke
 Middelburg
 Oostburg
 Retranchement
 Sluis
 Vlissingen
 Zierikzee

North Brabant 

 Bergen op Zoom
 Breda
 Geertruidenberg
 Grave
 Helmond
 's-Hertogenbosch
 Heusden
 Klundert
 Megen
 Oss
 Ravenstein
 Steenbergen
 Willemstad
 Woudrichem

Limburg 

 Arcen
 Gennep
 Maastricht
 Nieuwstadt
 Roermond
 Sittard
 Stevensweert
 Venlo
 Weert

Norway
Fredrikstad Fortress, Fredrikstad
Fredriksvern, Stavern
Kongsvinger Fortress, Kongsvinger
Kristiansten Fortress, Trondheim
Vardøhus Fortress, Vardø

Philippines 

 Fort Santiago (in Intramuros), Manila
 Fort San Pedro, Cebu City
 Fort Pilar, Zamboanga City
 Fuerte dela Concepcion y del Triunfo, Ozamiz City

Portugal

Almeida
Azores - Fortaleza de São João Baptista/Fortaleza de São Sebastião (Terceira)
Cascais - Forte de Santo António da Barra, Cidadela de Cascais
Elvas - Forte de Santa Luzia
Estremoz
Évora
Lisbon-Forte de São Bruno, Forte de São Julião da Barra (Oeiras)
Monção
Peniche
Valença
Fort São Roque
 Nossa Senhora da Graça Fort

Poland
Zamość Fortress
Koźle
Boyen Fortress
Poznań Fortress
Krzyżtopór
Kłodzko Fortress
Srebrnogórska Fortress
Nysa
Gdańsk
Toruń
Wisloujscie Fortress

Puerto Rico

 Fort San Cristóbal, San Juan
 Castillo San Felipe del Morro, San Juan
 Fort Conde de Mirasol, Vieques
 Fortín San Juan de la Cruz, Toa Baja

Romania
Ada Kaleh
Alba Iulia
Arad
Făgăraș
Oradea
Timișoara
Miercurea Ciuc

Russia
 Peter and Paul Fortress, St. Petersburg
 Nyenschantz
 Pillau citadel (Baltiysk)
 Rostov Kremlin
 Abbasabad
Shlisselburg Fortress, Shlisselburg
New Dvina Fort, Arkhangelsk
Kronshlot, Kronstadt
Krasny Yar Fortress, Krasny Yar
Vyborg

São Tomé e Príncipe
 Santo António, Príncipe
 São Jerónimo, São Tomé
 São Sebastião, São Tomé

Serbia

Belgrade Fortress, Belgrade, partially razed after the Berlin Congress of 1878 and the end of the Military Frontier. Restored several times afterwards and areas repurposed.
Fetislam, Kladovo, Turkish bastion fort until 1867. Restored several times afterwards.
Niš Fortress, Niš, city defensive walls razed while the bastion fort was preserved.
 Pančevo Fortress, Pančevo, razed in 1739.
Petrovaradin Fortress, Novi Sad, best preserved bastion fort town of the Military Frontier.
Sremska Rača, Sremska Rača, razed after the Berlin Congress of 1878 and the end of the Military Frontier.

Slovakia

Nové Zámky - only to be seen as a hexagonally shaped city centre
Komárno - mostly preserved city fortification complex contains Komárno fortress (New and Old) and fortifications of the city as Palatine's line and Vah's line and also three forts in the area of neighbouring city Komárom (Igmand, Csillag and Monostor) (see Hungary)
Leopoldov - mostly preserved, serving as state prison built like Fortres Leopoldov
 Holíč - château of the Habsburgs named Holíč Castle rebuilt from a 17th-century fortress with the history going to 12th century.

South Africa
Fort de Goede Hoop 1652–1674, demolished after permanent residence was taken up in the Castle of Good Hope.
Castle of Good Hope 1666-current, constructed to replace the earthen Fort de Goede Hoop.

Spain

Aldea del Obispo - Real Fuerte de la Concepción
Badajoz
A Coruña-Castillo de San Antón y Castillo de San Diego
Barcelona-Castillo de Montjuïc y la Antigua Ciudadela Militar de Barcelona
Cádiz-Castillo de San Sebastián, Castillo de Santa Catalina, Baluarte de la Candelaria, Fuerte de Puntales y Fuerte de Cortadura
Ciudad Rodrigo
Ferrol-Castillo de San Felipe y Castillo de de La Palma
Figueres-Castell de Sant Ferran
Jaca-Ciudadela de Jaca
La Línea de la Concepción-fuertes de San Felipe, San Carlos, San Fernando, San José, Santa Mariana, San Benito, y Fuerte de Santa Bárbara
Pamplona-Ciudadela de Pamplona
Roses, Girona, Catalonia,-Ciudadela de Rosas
Salamanca
Salvaterra de Miño-Castillo de Santiago de Aytona
Palma de Mallorca

Sri Lanka
 Star Fort (Matara)
 Jaffna Fort (Jaffna)
Galle Fort

Suriname
Fort Nieuw-Amsterdam, New Amsterdam, Commewijne
Fort Zeelandia, Waterside, Paramaribo

Sweden
Landskrona Citadel
Malmö Castle
Varberg Fortress
Älvsborg Castle
Borgholm Castle
Karlsvärd Citadel
Bohus Fortress
Jönköping Castle
Eda Skans

Taiwan
Fengguiwei Fort
Fort Zeelandia
Fort Provintia
Fort San Salvador,  Keelung 
Eternal Golden Castle

United Kingdom

 Fort Amherst, Chatham
 Carisbrooke Castle, Isle of Wight
 Derry city walls
 Ebrington Barracks, Derry
 Fort George, Highland
 Berwick town walls, Berwick-upon-Tweed
 Hilsea Lines, 
 Fort Monckton, Gosport
 Pendennis Castle, Falmouth
 Royal Citadel, Plymouth
 Star Castle, Isles of Scilly
 Tilbury Fort

The outlines of some other star forts from the English Civil War exist. These were often built of ditches and earthen ramparts and were redoubts built to defend weak points in older fortifications such as Fort Royal Hill, Worcester, was built to defend a hill within 17th-century artillery range of the city's medieval walls.

United States
 Castillo de San Marcos, St. Augustine, Florida
 Fort Mifflin, Philadelphia, Pennsylvania
 Fort Morgan, Alabama
 Fort Union Valmora, New Mexico
 Fort Jay, on Governors Island in New York Bay
 Fort Wood, on Liberty Island in New York Bay
 Fort Brewerton Oneida River, mouth of Oneida Lake Oswego New York
 Fort Ticonderoga on Lake Champlain, New York
 Fort Saint-Frédéric, Crown Point, New York
 Fort Johnston (Leesburg, Virginia)
 Fort Negley, Nashville, Tennessee
 Fort Ligonier, Ligonier, Pennsylvania
 Russian Fort Elizabeth, Waimea, Kauai County, Hawaii
 Ninety Six National Historic Site, Star Fort in Ninety Six, South Carolina
 Star Fort, formerly Fort Alabama, Winchester, Virginia
 Fort St. Andrews, was located on Cumberland Island, Georgia.
 Fort Stanwix, Rome, New York
 Fort Ontario, Oswego, New York
 Fort Jackson, Louisiana Plaquemines Parish, Louisiana
 Fort Independence (Massachusetts), on Castle Island, Boston Massachusetts
 Fort Monroe in Hampton, Virginia
 Fort Lee in Salem, Massachusetts
Fort Zachary Taylor, Key West, FL
Fort Jefferson, Key West, FL
 Fort McHenry, Baltimore, Maryland
 Fort Frederick, on the Potomac River near Big Pool, Maryland
 Fort Marshall, Baltimore, Maryland
 Fort Snelling, St. Paul, Minnesota
 Fort de Chartres, Illinois

Venezuela
 Castillo de San Antonio de la Eminencia, Cumana

Vietnam
 Hanoi#The Imperial Citadel of Thang Long - Hoàng Thành Thăng Long
 Ha Tay Province# Son Tay Citadel - Thành Sơn Tây
 Bac Ninh Province#Bac Ninh Citadel - Thành Bắc Ninh
 Hai Duong Province#Hai Duong Fortress - Pháo đài Hải Dương/Thành Đông
 Thanh Hoa Province#Ho Citedel - Thành nhà Hồ
 Thanh Hoa Province#Hac Thanh Citadel - Thành Hạc Thành
 Nghe An Province#Vinh Citadel - Thành Nghệ An/Vinh
 Ha Tinh Province#Tan Giang Fortress - Pháo đài Tân Giang
 Ha Tinh Province#Ky Chau Fortress - Pháo đài Kỳ Châu
 Quang Binh Province#Dong Hoi Citadel - Thành Đồng Hới
 Quang Tri Province#Quang Tri Citadel - Thành Quảng Trị
 Thua Thien Hue Province#Hue City Citadel - Thành Huế
 Thua Thien Hue Province#Imperial Citadel - Kinh thành Huế
 Da Nang#Dien Hai Citadel - Thành Điện Hải
 Quang Ngai Province#Chau Sa Citadel - Thành Châu Sa
 Binh Dinh Province#Binh Dinh Citadel - Thành Bình Định
 Binh Dinh Province#Do Ban Citadel - Thành Đồ Bàn
 Phu Yen Province#Ho Citadel - Thành Hồ
 Khanh Hoa Province# Dien Khanh Citadel - Thành Diên Khánh
 Ho Chi Minh City#Saigon - Thành Gia Định

References

External links
 

+
Bastion
Bastion